Cherine is a female given name. Notable people with the name include:

 Chérine (born 1995), Belgian singer
 Cherine Abdellaoui (born 1998), Algerian Paralympic judoka
 Cherine Anderson (born 1984), Jamaican actress and vocalist
 Cherine Fahd (born 1974), Australian artist
 Cherine Alexander, Miss Continental 1984

Feminine given names